St. Ann's Church, also known as St. Ann's Church of Morrisania, is a historic Episcopal church in Mott Haven, the South Bronx, New York City.

History
Gouverneur Morris Jr. (1813-1888) had St. Ann's Church built in memory of his mother, Ann Cary Randolph Morris, who died in 1837. 

It was built in 1840 and donated by him as a family monument, the Morrisania Memorial. It is a fieldstone building in the Gothic Revival style with a vernacular Greek Revival style tower.  The complex includes the stone parish house added in 1916, late-19th century Sunday School and gymnasium building, and a graveyard that includes the Morris family crypt.  Among those whose remains are in the graveyard or crypt are Gouverneur Morris (1752–1816), Ann Cary Randolph Morris (1774-1837), Lewis Morris (1671–1746), and Lewis Morris (1726–1798).

The complex was listed on the National Register of Historic Places in 1980.   It was designated a New York City landmark in 1967.

References

See also
 List of New York City Designated Landmarks in The Bronx
 National Register of Historic Places in Bronx County, New York

External links

St. Ann's Episcopal Church website

Episcopal church buildings in the Bronx
Properties of religious function on the National Register of Historic Places in the Bronx
Gothic Revival church buildings in New York City
Churches completed in 1840
19th-century Episcopal church buildings
New York City Designated Landmarks in the Bronx
Mott Haven, Bronx